Ginger Hill, Pennsylvania is an unincorporated community in Washington County, Pennsylvania, United States.  It is home to the Ebenezer Covered Bridge.

Unincorporated communities in Washington County, Pennsylvania
Unincorporated communities in Pennsylvania